Geoffrey de Mandeville, 2nd Earl of Essex (died 1166) was an English nobleman, the second son of Geoffrey de Mandeville, 1st Earl of Essex and Rohese de Vere, Countess of Essex.

Life
During or soon after his father's rebellion against King Stephen in 1143–1144, young Geoffrey was sent or made his way to Devizes, a base of the Empress Matilda. After the earl's death, the empress recognized the right of Geoffrey III to the earldom of Essex and the vast Mandeville holdings. His whereabouts during the remaining years of King Stephen's reign are unknown. In January 1156 King Henry II confirmed Geoffrey's title as earl of Essex and the Mandeville lands, but not those lands or offices granted to his father during the civil war.

The earl served as an itinerant royal justice with Richard de Lucy in 1165–1166, visiting many of the counties of England. In 1166 he was engaged in preparations for a royal campaign in Wales when he fell ill and died in September or October. He was buried at Walden Priory in Essex, a monastery founded by his father. Geoffrey was succeeded by his brother, William de Mandeville, 3rd Earl of Essex.

Family
Earl Geoffrey married a kinswoman of King Henry, Eustachia, but when she complained that her husband would not live with her, the king helped her obtain an annulment. The couple were apparently childless.

References

Sources

12th-century births
1166 deaths
12th-century English people
Geoffrey
G

Year of birth unknown